Sir William Gillilan Johnson (1808 – 9 April 1886) was an Irish Conservative politician and barrister.

He was also Mayor of Belfast City Council in 1849.

References

External links
 

UK MPs 1841–1847
Irish Conservative Party MPs
1808 births
1886 deaths